Big Bend of the Colorado State Recreation Area is a  public recreation area on the west bank of the Colorado River in the Lower Colorado River Valley, located in Laughlin, an unincorporated township in Clark County, Nevada. The park has two miles of shoreline and riparian areas. The majority of its  consists of canyons and washes.

History
The commission transferred  to the Nevada Division of State Parks in 1991, which resulted in establishment of Big Bend of the Colorado State Recreation Area. It opened to the public in 1996.

Activities and amenities
The recreation area offers boating, fishing, camping, picnicking, and hiking on four miles of developed trails.

References

External links
Big Bend of the Colorado State Recreation Area Nevada State Parks
Big Bend of the Colorado State Recreation Area Trails Map Nevada State Parks

Lower Colorado River Valley
State parks of Nevada
Protected areas of Clark County, Nevada
Protected areas on the Colorado River
Protected areas established in 1996
1996 establishments in Nevada